Leo Gburek (born 18 April 1910 in Bismarckhütte; died 17 January 1941 in Shetland) was a German geophysicist and a member of the Third German Antarctic Expedition 1938/39.

Life 
Leo Gburek attended the Volksschule and Oberrealschule in Beuthen. In 1929 he began a study of geophysics at the University of Leipzig. In the summer months of 1937 and 1938 he took part in expeditions to Spitsbergen, where he undertook geomagnetic surveys. There he met Ernst Herrmann, who was also a member of the third German Antarctic Expedition led by Alfred Ritscher. Due to his polar experience Gburek was selected in October 1938 to join this expedition. His responsibilities included geomagnetic measurements on the Antarctic continent. A group of rocky elevations on the ice sheet was named by the expedition leader  Gburekspitzen (Gburek Peaks).

At the beginning of World War II Gburek was conscripted and served as a weather observer in the Luftwaffe in weather reconnaissance squadron Wekusta 1 / Ob.dL. In January 1941, his plane was shot down over the  Shetland Islands during a reconnaissance flight and he was killed, aged 30, during the crash landing at Vaasetter, Fair Isle. He was buried on 20 January 1941 in the cemetery of Fair Isle but, along with his colleague Georg Nentwig who also died in the crash, he was later reburied at the Cannock Chase German Military Cemetery, Staffordshire, England.

Publications 
 "Geophysikalischer Arbeitsbericht". In: Vorbericht über die Deutsche Antarktische Expedition 1938/39. Annalen der Hydrographie und Maritimen Meteorologie VIII (1939), Beiheft, S. 21–23.
 "Erdmagnetische Messungen, Eisuntersuchungen, Strahlungsmessungen und Kernzählungen". In: A. Ritscher (Hrsg.) Deutsche Antarktische Expedition 1938/39. Wissenschaftliche und fliegerische Ergebnisse. Band 2, Mundus, Hamburg 1954–1958, S. 97–100.

References

External links 
 Walter Hesse: Zum 10jährigen Todestag von Leo Gburek. Polarforschung Band 21, S. 32.

German polar explorers
German geophysicists
1910 births
1941 deaths
Burials at Cannock Chase German Military Cemetery
Leipzig University alumni
Luftwaffe personnel killed in World War II
Aviators killed in aviation accidents or incidents in Scotland